The Moscow Rachmaninov Trio is a piano trio that emerged in 1994 from the Moscow Ensemble for Contemporary Music. Its members are Victor Yampolsky (piano), Mikhail Tsinman (violin) and Natalia Savinova (cello). The trio is named after the Russian composer Sergei Rachmaninoff.

External links 
 Moscow Rachmaninov Trio at Hyperion Records (Englisch, French, German)
 Website of the Moscow Rachmaninov Trio (English, Russian)

Discography 

 Groupe Lacroix, The Composer Group, Creative Works Records 1997

 Sergei Rachmaninow, Trios, Hyperion Records 2000

 Dmitri Shostakovich: Piano Trios No. 1 & 2 / Sonata for Cello and Piano in D minor, Tudor 2006

 Franz Schubert, Piano Trios, Tudor 

Piano trios
Music in Moscow
Musical groups established in 1994
Sergei Rachmaninoff